Josef Suk may refer to:

Josef Suk (composer) (1874–1935), Czech composer and violinist
Josef Suk (violinist) (1929–2011), his grandson, Czech violinist and conductor